Albareda is a Spanish and Catalan surname. Notable people with the surname include:

Joaquim Albareda (born 1957), Spanish historian
Joaquín Albareda y Ramoneda (1892–1966), Spanish cardinal
José Luis Albareda y Sezde (1828–1897), Spanish politician and journalist
José María Albareda (1902–1966), Spanish scientist

References

Spanish-language surnames
Catalan-language surnames